The American Journal of Alzheimer's Disease & Other Dementias is a peer-reviewed academic journal that publishes papers in the field of neurology. The journal's editor is Carol F. Lippa, MD (Drexel University College of Medicine). It has been in publication since 1986 and is currently published by SAGE Publications.

Scope 
The American Journal of Alzheimer's Disease & Other Dementias is aimed primarily at professionals on the frontline of Alzheimer's care, dementia and clinical depression and other specialists who manage patients with dementias and their families. The journal aims to provide practical information about medical, psychiatric and nursing issues.

Abstracting and indexing 
The American Journal of Alzheimer's Disease & Other Dementias is abstracted and indexed in, among other databases:  SCOPUS, and the Social Sciences Citation Index. According to the Journal Citation Reports, its 2010 impact factor is 1.774, ranking it 104 out of 185 journals in the category ‘Clinical Neurology'. and 27 out of 45 journals in the category ‘Geriatrics & Gerontology'.

References

External links 
 

SAGE Publishing academic journals
English-language journals
Alzheimer's disease journals
Publications established in 1986
Monthly journals